Erwin Arnold (born 5 November 1968) is an Austrian former bobsledder. He competed in the four man event at the 1998 Winter Olympics.

References

External links
 

1968 births
Living people
Austrian male bobsledders
Olympic bobsledders of Austria
Bobsledders at the 1998 Winter Olympics
People from Hall in Tirol
Sportspeople from Tyrol (state)